Lü Yunfeng (born November 6, 1995) is a Chinese actor. He was affiliated to Comic Communication Co. between 2016-17.

Biography 
He graduated from Communication University of Zhejiang and debuted as an actor in 2015 with a supporting role in the television series Long Distance, and officially entered the entertainment industry. In that same year, he acted as host of a meeting in China of the Taiwanese groups SpeXial and Angel 'N' Devil.

In 2016, he gained recognition acting as the melancholic king Ling Guang in the popular web series Men with Sword.

Filmography

Web series

Movies

References

External links 
 
 

1995 births
Living people
Chinese male television actors
Chinese male film actors
21st-century Chinese male actors
Communication University of Zhejiang alumni